César Augusto Parra Muñoz (born 10 August 1942) is a Chilean diplomat and is the current Ambassador Extraordinary and Plenipotentiary of the Republic of Chile to the Russian Federation, presenting his Letter of Credence to then-President of Russia Vladimir Putin on 25 July 2006.

References 

1942 births
Living people
20th-century Chilean lawyers
20th-century Chilean economists
Heads of universities in Chile
University of Concepción alumni
University of Antwerp alumni
Radical Party of Chile politicians
Radical Social Democratic Party politicians
Ambassadors of Chile to Russia
Ambassadors of Chile to Ukraine